Restrepo is a town and  municipality located in the Department of Valle del Cauca, Colombia. It was founded December 1, 1913 by Julio Fernandez Medina, Anselmo Rendon Nicanor Grisales and other settlers. It has been a Municipality since April 3, 1925, under Ordinance No. 030 of the Departmental Assembly. Mostly mountainous, its major economic activities are agriculture and animal husbandry. Its key products are banana, pineapple, sugarcane cane, beans, fruits, vegetables and corn.

References 

Municipalities of Valle del Cauca Department
Populated places established in 1913
1913 establishments in Colombia